Khetri Mahal (Hindi: खेतड़ी महल ), also known as the Wind Palace, whose ruins are an example of palace architecture in the Indian state of Rajasthan.

History

Khetri Mahal was constructed by Bhopal Singh around 1770. Bhopal Singh was the grandson of Sardul Singh. Maharaja Sawai Pratap Singh of Jaipur built his Hawa Mahal, also known as the Wind Palace, on the model of the Khetri Mahal, in 1799. Khetri in itself was considered to be the second wealthiest ‘Thikana’ under Jaipur.

Between 1870 and 1901, Ajit Singh of Khetri reigned as a ruler of the Shekhawat dynasty of the Indian state of Khetri.

Architecture

Khetri Mahal is located behind a series of lanes. It is a paragon of Shekhawati art and architecture. It is primarily known for its fine paintings and murals mainly supporting the Raghunath temple and Bhopalgarh fort. The palace is remarkable among buildings of its region because of the flow of wind through its open portals rather than stopped windows or doors.

Wherever structurally possible, the walls have been pierced with arched openings. The levels of the Palace are combined through a series of ramps, installed to facilitate the movement of horseback guests toward the terrace, which gives commanding views.

Two small alcoves contain fragments of older paintings in the private chamber of Thakurs. Most of these paintings were executed in natural earth pigments. The interior rooms are open and colonnaded, the columns often surmounted with openwork and curved arches.

Most of the rooms are connected through arched portals rather than with doors, and much of the masonry is covered with a pinkish plaster.

One enters the palace via a student hostel at the base of the structure.

Gallery

See also 

 Rajput architecture
 Shekhawati

References

External links

 Jhunjhunu information
 Shekhawatihelp
 Jhunjhunu district website
  Website about Jhunjhunu, with photographs

Rajput architecture
Palaces in Rajasthan
Jhunjhunu district
Rajasthani culture